Catocala nubila is a moth of the family Erebidae. It is found in Japan, the far east of Russia and Korea.

The wingspan is 27–28 mm.

The larvae feed on the leaves of Fagus.

References

External links
Species info
Species info

nubila
Moths of Korea
Moths of Japan
Erebid moths of Asia
Moths described in 1881